The men's field hockey tournament at the 2022 Commonwealth Games will be held at the University of Birmingham Hockey and Squash Centre between 29 July and 8 August 2022.

Qualification
England qualified as host nation, Australia qualified as defending champions, and the other teams qualified by FIH Men's World Ranking.

Competition format
In March 2022, ten teams were drawn into two groups; the top two performing teams in each group advance to the semi-finals, whilst the remaining teams are sent to lower classification matches to determine their final ranking.

Umpires

Steve Rogers (AUS)
Tyler Klenk (CAN)
Bruce Bale (ENG)
Dan Barstow (ENG)
Nick Bennett (ENG)
Deepak Joshi (IND)
Peter Kabaso (KEN)
Ilanggo Kanabathu (MAS)
Tim Bond (NZL)
David Tomlinson (NZL)
Sean Rapaport (RSA)
Fraser Bell (SCO)

Group stage

Pool A

Pool B

Classification matches

Ninth place match

Seventh place match

Fifth place match

Medal round

Bracket

Semi-finals

Bronze medal match

Gold medal match

Final position

Goalscorers

References

External links
FIH 2022 Commonwealth Games (M)

Hockey at the 2022 Commonwealth Games